Naseebo Lal is a Pakistani folk singer who sings primarily in Saraiki, Punjabi, Urdu and Marwari languages. She performed in traditional Pakistani stage shows. She debuted as a featured artist in [[Coke Studio Pakistan (season 9)|Coke Studio'''s ninth season]]. She sang Groove Mera alongside Aima Baig and Young Stunners. She also sang Tu Jhoom  with Abida Parveen in [[Coke Studio (Pakistani season 14)|Coke Studio's Season 14]]. The song Tu Jhoom featured in the ending of episode 5 of the Marvel series Ms. Marvel''.

References

External links
 Naseebo Lal Audio Collection
 Naseebo Lal Audio Collection
 Naseebo Lal Life Style
 

 Punjabimp3song

Living people
1970 births
Pakistani people of Rajasthani descent
Punjabi-language singers
Singers from Lahore
21st-century Pakistani women singers